Telphusa syncratopa is a moth of the family Gelechiidae. It is found in China.

References

Moths described in 1935
Telphusa
Taxa named by Edward Meyrick